The "Barassi Line" is an imaginary line in Australia which approximately divides areas where Australian rules football and rugby league is the most popular football code. It was first used by historian Ian Turner in his "1978 Ron Barassi Memorial Lecture". Crowd figures, media coverage, and participation rates are heavily skewed in favour of the dominant code on both sides of the line.

Despite Australia's relatively homogeneous culture, a strong dichotomy exists in the country's football sporting culture. The divide has existed since Australian rules football and rugby union developed their identities as distinct codes. Australian rules football is the most popular football code to the west and south of the line, including the capitals of Melbourne, Perth, Adelaide, Hobart, and Darwin while rugby league and rugby union are more popular on the eastern side, in the capitals of Sydney, Brisbane and Canberra. Each side represents roughly half of the Australian population due to the concentration of the population on the east coast.

Roughly speaking, the line follows Queensland's western border, drops southeast through western New South Wales, and ends at the Pacific Ocean at Cape Howe on the border of New South Wales and Victoria. It divides New South Wales, placing the Riverina area of southern New South Wales and the western mining city of Broken Hill on the Australian rules football side, and the rest on the rugby side. The line once ran through the Australian Capital Territory, where each sport has had similar prominence at different times throughout history – although the rugby codes have established greater prominence there in the decades since the line was first proposed.

At the time the term was first used, neither code had professional teams or leagues operating on the opposing side. In the years since, Australian Football League (AFL) in Australian rules football, the National Rugby League (NRL), and the multinational body SANZAAR which organises the Super Rugby competition in rugby union, expanded their domestic competitions to include teams from both sides of the line.

Most other sports in Australia do not share this separation, though Association football (soccer)'s participation and growth per capita is by far strongest to the east of the line. Cricket has been played on a national scale by state representative teams for over 100 years and, in 1977, soccer became the first sport in Australia to start a club-based national league.

Origin
The Ron Barassi Memorial Lecture was a series of lectures given between 1966 and 1978 by Ian Turner, a professor of history at Monash University, that were named after Ron Barassi, Sr. Barassi played a number of Australian rules football games for Melbourne in the Victorian Football League (VFL) before enlisting to fight in World War II and subsequently dying in action at Tobruk.

The Barassi Line itself was named after Ron Barassi, the former Barassi's son, who was a star player for Melbourne and Carlton and a premiership-winning coach with Carlton and North Melbourne. He believed in spreading the code of Australian rules football around the nation with an evangelical zeal, and became coach and major supporter of the relocated Sydney Swans. He foresaw a time when Australian rules football clubs from around Australia, including up to four from New South Wales and Queensland, would play in a national football league with only a handful of them based in Melbourne, but his ideas were largely ridiculed at the time.

League structures and expansions
The pursuit of national exposure for sports is influenced by the ratings systems used by Australian television. By the late 1980s, the main football codes in Australia realised that in order to garner the desired high national ratings, and increase the value of their product for television broadcast deals and corporate sponsors, they needed to maximise their national exposure. This meant heavy investment in grassroots development and in the support of clubs on the "other" side of the Barassi Line.

Australian rules football
In 1990, the Victorian Football League changed its name to the Australian Football League (AFL) to pursue a more national focus. A major reason for the expansion into these non-traditional areas has been to increase both the number of games played each week, and the potential television audience. This resulted in income from television rights rising dramatically. By 1997, six of sixteen AFL clubs were based outside Victoria, with two on the Rugby League side of the Barassi Line. With the establishment of the Sydney Swans, Greater Western Sydney Giants, Brisbane Lions and Gold Coast Suns, Ron Barassi Jr's prophecy of a national Australian rules football league with four teams in New South Wales and Queensland has been fulfilled, although all four clubs remain largely unpopular in terms of market share and financially unstable.

Australian Capital Territory

The ACT was once seen as one of the dividing points of the line. In 1981, the ACTAFL, had just begun to edge out rugby league in popularity with an increase in participation and the first calls were made for the VFL to become a national competition. Under significant pressure from rugby league junior development in the territory and fearing the impact on its strong local competition of entry of a Sydney team, a formal bid for license to enter a Canberra team into the VFL was made. The VFL dismissed it, stating it would consider Canberra for a license "within the next 10 years" The league was insistent that the license should go to Sydney which it believed had a much larger potential broadcast audience. The following year, the NSW Rugby League entered the Canberra market with a new Canberra Raiders club. The long term impact of the lack of an AFL club and the introduction of the Canberra Raiders saw Australian rules fall from marginally most popular to least popular of the football codes. Subsequent bids for a Canberra team were rejected by the AFL in 1981, 1986, 1988, 1990 and 1993 with the AFL preferring its existing clubs, most notably North Melbourne to sell their home games. AFL clubs have done so since 2002, however have refrained from committing to the market long term. The ACT is now behind the Barassi line, and the code continues to decline and slip further behind other codes. The popularity of rugby football and soccer, combined with the Australian rules football's ageing infrastructure act as significant deterrents to any future AFL expansion there. 

The Greater Western Sydney Giants in 2012 signed a 10-year deal with the ACT government worth $23 million which results in the club playing four home games in Canberra during each season. The Giants draw higher average attendances at Manuka Oval in Canberra than their home ground in Sydney. In response to questions relating to a proposed Canberra team, AFL CEO Gillon McLachlan stated in 2015 that "Canberra have their own team, the Giants". The AFL also claims that the stadium needs to be upgraded in order for the league to commit further to the market. After a failed $800 million stadium upgrade proposal the AFL stated that the Giants-Canberra deal would continue whether or not the redevelopment occurs. A significant share of Giants members are from the ACT, the figure was 5,800 in 2022. The club in 2015 set a target to overtake the Raiders membership and have 10,000+ members by 2018, however it failed and the Raiders membership has rapidly outpaced it. This in itself however would remain insignificant if it occurred, due to the lesser role that memberships play in rugby league.

New South Wales

Encouraged by the VFL, the South Melbourne Football Club relocated to Sydney and became the Sydney Swans in 1982. The club endured limited success and a series of wooden spoons in their first decade in Sydney before rallying for a series of good years in the mid-1990s onward, culminating in premierships in 2005 and 2012. 

The lack of public support in Sydney caused significant financial losses to the club and league during the late 1980s and 1990s. Excluding a period of privatisation despite significant loans and writedowns to the club the league declared it insolvent in 1984, and in 1988. In 1992 the 15 other AFL clubs were asked to vote on expelling it due to its inability to survive in Sydney. AFL clubs were left with little other option but to commit to subsidising it to maintain an audience in Sydney. These subsidies were increased until the Swans became viable in the long term. This long term sustainability was initially aided by a 1996 AFL Grand Final appearance and the impact of the Super League war on rugby league. 

In addition to promoting the Swans, the AFL attempted to use Auskick participation as a tool to increase awareness in the Sydney market by introducing a generation of children to the sport, however the success of this strategy has been criticised. A 2012 study by David Lawson, a Melbourne University academic, commission by the AFL found that contrary to reports by the league, club participation rates in Sydney had actually stalled, and that the AFL was masking low figures by using short term, non-club affiliated Auskick participants and comparing them to competitive junior club participation numbers in other sports. The league was also accused of faking registration figures in an attempt to gain access to Sydney playing fields.

The AFL introduced a second New South Wales team, based in Western Sydney in 2012 subsidised with millions of investment with a generational vision to grow into the Greater Western Sydney region. As part of its effort to win over rugby league followers in Sydney, the AFL recruited rugby league star Israel Folau, who had not even heard of the sport, using a promotional salary of more than $6 million over four years. Folau broke his AFL contract after just one AFL season and his conversion was criticised by the media as a failed promotional exercise. The strategic success of the Giants franchise has been widely questioned. Despite a 2019 AFL Grand Final, the club's Sydney audience since then has failed to grow. 

The AFL began zone and academy recruitment programs fostering talented young players from clubs in the Riverina (where the code retains a strong following) to Sydney and helping the code to recruit talented athletes from metropolitan areas. In addition to the growth of the game in Sydney, this grassroots expansion has contributed to the Barassi Line moving slightly further north of the border. However the long campaign to lift the sports's popularity in Sydney and New South Wales has been hindered by deep rooted cultural barriers which even an Australian senate inquiry has described as insurmountable. The AFL continues to ignore this in its fruitless pursuit of market share in Australia's most populous state.

Queensland

The Brisbane Bears were founded as an privately owned expansion team to the VFL in 1986, initially based on the Gold Coast. It suffered enormously with the introduction of the rugby league expansion club, the Broncos based in Brisbane, which was specifically created to deny the Bears and the VFL a market. The Bears performed poorly on field, including back-to-back wooden spoons between 1990 and 1991. Poor support for the club in both the Gold Coast and Brisbane saw it run into financial difficulties despite significant AFL subsidies and concessions. With their imminent demise the AFL intervened and forced a merger with the Melbourne-based Fitzroy Lions in 1996. 

The newly formed Brisbane Lions were vastly more successful, becoming the first triple-premiership winner in 46 years, winning back-to-back in 2001, 2002 and 2003. The success of the Lions contributed to a boom in the sport across the major Queensland cities. 

As a result of the Lions success, the AFL pushed heavily for a permanent presence on the Gold Coast, and despite failed attempts to relocate an existing club, granted a new license to the Gold Coast Football Club (later branded as the Suns) in 2009. As part of its effort to win over rugby league followers in Queensland, the AFL recruited rugby league star Karmichael Hunt using a promotional salary of more than $3.2 million. The AFL considered Hunt's promotional recruitment "a good investment" despite his return to rugby league. 

While the AFL has gained marketshare in the major cities, the Barassi line has barely moved in Queensland. A notable exception is the expansion of AFL Mount Isa in the state's west to include the outback Dajarra Rhinos team in 2018, the only senior club of any code within hundreds of kilometres of the state border. Rugby league remains otherwise entrenched at the grassroots across the state. The Lions and Suns generally only receive support from the Queensland public when they are performing well and as such require significant concessions from the AFL to remain viable.

Rugby league

Rugby League has been played in Victoria and South Australia since 1914, and Western Australia since at least the 1940s.

In 1995 the Australian Rugby League (ARL) created four new expansion teams including one in Perth, resulting in the first major rugby league club based on the Australian rules football side of the Barassi Line, the Western Reds. By the time the breakaway Super League started in 1997 a second club on the opposite side of the line was created, the Adelaide Rams. A third club on the opposite side of the line, the Melbourne Storm, was due to start in the 1998 season of Super League but, in the meantime, the opposing leagues made restitution and established the National Rugby League (NRL). Part of the agreement to form a new league included a reduction of clubs in the league, especially those recently established in difficult markets, resulting in the disbanding of the clubs in Perth and Adelaide. The Melbourne Storm continued with success in the new competition, achieving their first premiership win in 1999. 

When a Melbourne NRL side was proposed in 1997, Barassi stated to the media, "I've always thought rugby league would be a success in Melbourne. They've got to start down here sometime and the earlier the better. Melburnians love their sport and I'm sure they'd get behind rugby league. But they won't accept rubbish and that's the key to it."

In the aftermath of the Super League war, the NRL became very reluctant to expand. Current commissioner chairman Peter V'landys has signaled that the competition is focused on creating a second team in Brisbane, instead of investing money into AFL states such as Western Australia, which "don't have a huge audience" for rugby league.

Rugby league remains almost equal in stature and popularity as Australian Rules football in the Northern Territory. Although there are no plans for an NT-based NRL team, the Darwin Rugby League and Central Australian competition continue to expand in size and participation share.

There are official bids for expansion teams on both sides of the line; in Queensland, from Brisbane and Rockhampton, from the NSW Central Coast as well as from Perth on the other side. The only NRL club on the non-traditional side of the Barassi Line remains the Melbourne Storm.

Rugby union

Rugby union has also attempted to expand on the Australian football side of the Barassi Line, with mixed results. Shortly after the sport went professional in August 1995, the Australian Rugby Union (ARU) joined forces with the New Zealand Rugby Football Union and South African Rugby Union to create the Super 12 competition. It began in 1996 with five regional franchises from New Zealand, four provincial teams from South Africa, and three state/territory teams from Australia. The three Australian teams were all on the traditional side of the Barassi Line; the Brisbane-based Reds, the Canberra-based Brumbies and the Sydney-based Waratahs. The league expanded by two teams, one each in Australia and South Africa, for 2006, with the competition then becoming the Super 14. Significantly, the new Australian team, the Western Force, was based in Perth on the opposite side of the line.

The following year, the ARU sought to create a national domestic competition, launching the Australian Rugby Championship (ARC). It launched with eight teams, with the Melbourne Rebels and Perth Spirit based on the opposite side of the line. However, the ARC lasted only one season.

The next expansion of rugby union on the opposite side of the line came in 2011, when the current Melbourne Rebels were added as Australia's fifth team in the newly renamed Super Rugby.

In 2013, the ARU announced that a new domestic competition, the National Rugby Championship (NRC), would start play in 2014. Of its nine inaugural teams, two were on the Australian rules side of the Barassi Line—Melbourne Rising and a revived Perth Spirit. Both teams remain in the league to this day.

Neither the Western Force nor the Melbourne Rebels have qualified for the finals series in either the Super 14 or Super Rugby, while the Brumbies, Waratahs and Reds, from the traditional areas have all won championships. In 2017, the Western Force was cut from the Super Rugby competition for the 2018 season. Teams from the Australian rules side of the line have enjoyed more success in the NRC. Both Melbourne Rising and Perth Spirit have made the finals series three times, and Perth won the NRC title in 2016.

Current situation
Four professional Australian football clubs, two rugby union Super Rugby clubs and one rugby league club, exist on the non-traditional side of the Barassi Line.

An academic study conducted from 2007 to 2011 shows that the traditional divide remains evident between the two sections of the Barassi Line. The study found:

Australian rules football east of the line

Australian Capital Territory
Governing body: AFL NSW/ACT

 Australian Football League (AFL):
 No clubs (AFL Giants play four home games per season at Manuka Oval as an unofficial second home)
 AFL Expansion Bid (1990): "Australian Capital Territory"
 Proposed Relocation of North Melbourne (2002): "Canberra Kangaroos"

 AFL Women's (AFLW):
 No clubs (AFLW Giants since 2019 play some home games at Manuka Oval as an unofficial second home)

New South Wales
Governing body: AFL NSW/ACT

 Australian Football League (AFL):
 1982–present: Sydney Swans
 2012–present: Greater Western Sydney Giants (Since 2012 play four home games per season in Canberra, ACT)
 Proposed Relocation of Fitzroy (1980): "Sydney Lions"
 Proposed Relocation of North Melbourne (1999): "Sydney Kangaroos"

 AFL Women's (AFLW):
 2017–present: Greater Western Sydney Giants (Women's)
 2023: Sydney Swans (Women's) (expansion team)

Queensland
Governing body: AFL Queensland

 Australian Football League (AFL):
 1987–1996: Brisbane Bears
 1997–present: Brisbane Lions
 2011–present: Gold Coast Suns
 Proposed Relocation of Fitzroy (1986): "Brisbane Lions"
 AFL Expansion Bid (1996): Southport Sharks
 Proposed Relocation of North Melbourne (2007): "Gold Coast Kangaroos"

 AFL Women's (AFLW):
 2017–present: Brisbane Lions (Women's)
 2020–present: Gold Coast Suns (Women's)

Rugby league west of the line

Northern Territory
Governing body: Northern Territory Rugby League

 National Rugby League (NRL): 
 No clubs

 NRL Women's Premiership (NRLW):
 No clubs

South Australia
Governing body: South Australia Rugby League

 National Rugby League (NRL): 
 1997–1998: Adelaide Rams

 NRL Women's Premiership (NRLW):
 No clubs

Tasmania
Governing body: Tasmanian Rugby League

 National Rugby League (NRL): 
 No clubs

 NRL Women's Premiership (NRLW):
 No clubs

Victoria
Governing body: Victorian Rugby League

 National Rugby League (NRL):
 1998–present: Melbourne Storm

 NRL Women's Premiership (NRLW):
 No clubs

Western Australia
Governing body: Western Australia Rugby League

 National Rugby League (NRL): 
 1995–1997: Perth Reds
 NRL Expansion Bid (2022): West Coast Pirates
 NRL Expansion Bid (2022): Western Bears

 NRL Women's Premiership (NRLW):
 No clubs

Rugby union west of the line

Northern Territory
Governing body: Northern Territory Rugby Union

 Super Rugby:
 No clubs

 Super W:
 No clubs

South Australia
Governing body: South Australia Rugby Union

 Super Rugby:
 No clubs

 Super W:
 No clubs

Tasmania
Governing body: Tasmanian Rugby Union

 Super Rugby:
 No clubs

 Super W:
 No clubs

Victoria
Governing body: Victorian Rugby Union

 Super Rugby:
 2011–present: Melbourne Rebels

 Super W:
 2018–present: Melbourne Rebels (Women's)

Western Australia
Governing Body: RugbyWA

 Super Rugby:
 2006-2017: Western Force

 Super W:
 2018–present: Western Force (Women's) 
 2019–present: RugbyWA (Women's)

References

External links
The Barassi Line Investigation by Colin Ross

Football in Australia
Sport in the Riverina
Rugby union in Australia
Rugby league in Australia
Australian rules football in Australia